Terebra levantina is a species of sea snail, a marine gastropod mollusc in the family Terebridae, the auger snails.

Description

Distribution
This marine species occurs off the Philippines.

References

 Aubry, U. (1999). Nuove terebre e antichi versi. Ancona: L'Informatore Piceno. 47 pp.
 Terryn, Y. (2007). Terebridae: A Collectors Guide. Conchbooks & Natural Art. 59 pp + plates

External links
  Sprague J.E. (2004) Four new species of Terebridae (Mollusca: Gastropoda) from the Philippine Islands. Beagle 20: 25–29

Terebridae
Gastropods described in 1999